Unguarded may refer to:
 Unguarded (Amy Grant album), 1985
 Unguarded (Rae Morris album), 2015
 Unguarded, an Emmy-nominated ESPN documentary about basketball player Chris Herren